Messick High School was a public high school in Memphis, Tennessee, established in 1908 and operated from 1909 to 1981. The main building was demolished in 1982, but Memphis City Schools uses some other former Messick facilities to house the Messick Adult Education Center. 

Messick High School was built by Shelby County to consolidate three elementary schools. It was a full 12 grade school until 1912 when the high school grades 9-12 were moved to the new and nearby West Tennessee Normal School (Now U of M) to train teachers. After that Messick School included only elementary grades, but a high school building was added in the 1920s and all 12 school grades were enrolled as of 1924. At the time of its construction, the school was in a rural area of Shelby County called Buntyn, Tennessee, where truck farming was a major economic activity.  

The school was named for Elizabeth Messick (1876-1951), a University of Chicago graduate who was superintendent of Shelby County Schools from 1904 to 1908 and who had been criticized for spending $30,000 to build the new high school. Messick later married Memphis Commercial Appeal journalist Elmer E. Houck and used the name Elizabeth Messick Houck.

In its rural location, some early students lived too far from the school to walk there, so they were transported to school in horse- or mule-drawn wagons. Initially, lunches were provided by students' mothers who brought hot meals to the school at mid-day. With time, Messick became the first school in West Tennessee to have a school cafeteria.  

Residential subdivisions grew up in the surrounding area in the 1920s. In the 1930s, Messick became part of the Memphis City Schools system. Much additional residential development occurred in the area in the late 1940s, after World War II ended. By the 1970s, however, the neighborhood was losing population and Messick's enrollment declined. In the 1970s, Messick high school also had kindergarten classes. The city school board voted to close the school. The graduating class of 1981 was Messick's last, and the school's main building was demolished in 1982.

Notable alumni
Packy Axton, American musician
Dick Davis, American football player
Ted Davis, American football player
Donald "Duck" Dunn, bass guitarist and song writer
William Fones, Tennessee Supreme Court Justice
Steve Owens, chair of the Tennessee Democratic Party
Michael Pearl, minister
Ruth Welting, operatic soprano
Jimi Jamison, Singer of Survivor, Cobra, Target
Gary Burbank (real name Billy Purser), Louisville and Cincinnati Radio Personality, member of the National Radio Hall of Fame

References

Schools in Memphis, Tennessee
Educational institutions established in 1908
Educational institutions disestablished in 1981
Defunct schools in Tennessee
1908 establishments in Tennessee
1981 disestablishments in Tennessee
Demolished buildings and structures in Tennessee
Buildings and structures demolished in 1982